The Dhaka Metropolis cricket team is a Bangladeshi first-class cricket team based in Dhaka, Bangladesh. The team competes in the National Cricket League.

Dhaka Metropolis played in the 2000-01 season, playing most of its home games at the Dhanmondi Cricket Stadium in Dhaka. When the National Cricket League was expanded from six teams to eight in 2011-12, Dhaka Metropolis returned, along with the newly formed Rangpur Division team. Since then Dhaka Metropolis has had no settled home ground, playing its home matches at several grounds in the Dhaka area.

Seasons

Current squad
, The current squad for 2019–20 season

Notable players
The following is a list of players who have played for both Dhaka Metropolis and Bangladesh.

 Akram Khan
 Al Sahariar
 Aminul Islam Bulbul
 Anwar Hossain
 Elias Sunny
 Enamul Haque
 Habibul Bashar
 Hasibul Hossain
 Khaled Mahmud
 Khaled Mashud
 Manjural Islam
 Mehrab Hossain
 Mehrab Hossain, Jr.
 Mohammad Ashraful
 Mohammad Rafique
 Morshed Ali Khan
 Naimur Rahman
 Niamur Rashid
 Nabiul Islam Nayeem
 Sajjad Ahmed
 Salahuddin Ahmed
 Talha Jubair
 Tareq Aziz

Dhaka Metropolis players who have played for countries other than Bangladesh:
  Zahoor Elahi

Records
At the end of the 2017–18 season Dhaka Metropolis had played 58 matches, with 15 wins, 15 losses and 28 draws. The highest score is 209 by Marshall Ayub in 2012–13. The best bowling figures are 8 for 35 by Talha Jubair in 2012–13.

References

External links
 Dhaka Metropolis at CricketArchive
 Cricinfo team profile

Other source
 Wisden Cricketers Almanack (annual)

Bangladeshi first-class cricket teams
Cricket in Dhaka
Bangladesh National Cricket League
Cricket clubs established in 2000
2000 establishments in Bangladesh